"Brother Louie" is a song by German duo Modern Talking, released as the lead single from their third studio album, Ready for Romance (1986). It was their fourth consecutive single to top the German Singles Chart, after "You're My Heart, You're My Soul", "You Can Win If You Want" and "Cheri, Cheri Lady".

Background
"Brother Louie" was released on 27 January 1986 and it reached  1 on 3 March 1986 in Germany. The single spent four weeks at the top and total of 17 weeks on the German chart. In the United Kingdom, it peaked at No. 4 in the charts and went silver for shipments in excess of 250,000 units. "Brother Louie" was also certified silver in France for selling over 250,000 units.

It is believed that the song was written by Dieter Bohlen about producer Luis Rodríguez, as he was a close associate of Bohlen and worked on many of the Modern Talking songs.

In 1998, not long after the duo's reunion, a remixed version of the single was released, titled "Brother Louie '98". The single, released in a new sleeve, was also successful. It went gold in France for selling over 250,000 units.

Music video
The music video of "Brother Louie" was directed by Pit Weyrich and contains footage from the 1984 film Once Upon a Time in America, interspersed with the band members playing on a stage surrounded by dancing fans.

Track listing 

 German 12" maxi single

 "Brother Louie" (Special Long Version) – 5:20
 "Brother Louie" (Instrumental) – 4:06

German 7" single

 "Brother Louie" – 3:41
 "Brother Louie" (Instrumental) – 4:06

 UK 12" maxi single

 "Brother Louie" (Special Long Version) – 5:15
 "Doctor for My Heart" – 3:16
 "Brother Louie" (Instrumental) – 4:06

 UK 7" single

 "Brother Louie" – 3:41
 "Brother Louie" (Instrumental) – 4:06

Charts

Weekly charts

Year-end charts

Certifications

"Brother Louie '98"

"Brother Louie '98" is the re-packaged version of the original 1986 version of "Brother Louie", released as the second single from Modern Talking's seventh studio album, Back for Good (1998), and also the second single following the duo's reunion. "Brother Louie '98". The single, as the first single "You're My Heart, You're My Soul '98" off Back For Good, features Eric Singleton.

"Brother Louie '98" was released in Germany and in other European territories on 20 July 1998. The single charted within the top 20 in Germany and Austria, while reaching number one in Hungary, the top five in France and the top 10 in Sweden. In France, "Brother Louie '98" reached gold status for selling over 250,000 units.

Track listing
CD maxi single
"Brother Louie '98" (Radio Edit) – 3:23
"Brother Louie '98" – 3:35
"Brother Louie '98" (Extended Version) – 4:11
"Cheri Cheri Lady '98" (Extended Version) – 4:26

Personnel
Music by: Dieter Bohlen
Writer: Dieter Bohlen
Rapper: Eric Singleton
Changes: Dieter Bohlen
Production: Dieter Bohlen
Co-production: Luis Rodríguez
Publication: Blue Obsession Music/Warner Chappell/Intro
Distribution: BMG Company
Photography: Manfred Vormstein
Design: Reinsberg WAB

Charts

Weekly charts

Year-end charts

Certifications

"Brother Louie '99"

"Brother Louie '99" is another re-packaged version of the original "Brother Louie" from Modern Talking's album Back for Good. This version was released solely for the UK market and contains remixes that were not included on "Brother Louie '98".

Track listingsCD maxi single "Brother Louie '99" (DJ Cappiccio Radio Mix) – 3:54
 "Brother Louie '99" (DJ Cappiccio Extended Mix) – 7:33
 "Brother Louie '99" (Metro Club Mix) – 6:1412-inch single "Brother Louie '99" (DJ Cappiccio 12" Mix) – 7:35
 "Brother Louie '99" (DJ Cappiccio Radio Mix) – 3:54
 "Brother Louie '99" (DJ Cappiccio Instrumental) – 7:34
 "Brother Louie '99" (DJ Cappicio Acapella) – 6:472× 12-inch single'''
 "Brother Louie '99" (Metro Club Mix) – 6:13
 "Brother Louie '99" (Metro Radio Mix) – 3:48
 "Brother Louie '99" (Paul Masterson Club Mix) – 6:39
 "Brother Louie '99" (Paul Masterson Dub) – 6:26

Kay One version

The song was covered by German rapper and singer Kay One in 2017 as "Louis Louis". The adaptation borrows largely from the original, but with new all-German lyrics and an added rap section, the latter including additional sampling from the song.

The single reached No. 9 on the German Singles Chart. The song also charted in Austria and Switzerland.

Music video
Kay One also released a music video that opens with some verses of the original Modern Talking song "Brother Louie" with Kay One browsing a number of Modern Talking release covers.

Charts

Certifications

Vize version

In July 2020, German DJ duo Vize, Kazakh DJ Imanbek and Modern Talking member Dieter Bohlen released a cover of "Brother Louie", with Leony singing the chorus parts.

Charts

Certifications

References

External links
 

1986 singles
1986 songs
1998 singles
1999 singles
2017 singles
2020 singles
Ariola Records singles
Hansa Records singles
Kontor Records singles
Modern Talking songs
Number-one singles in Finland
Number-one singles in Germany
Number-one singles in Greece
Number-one singles in Hungary
Number-one singles in Sweden
Song recordings produced by Dieter Bohlen
Songs written by Dieter Bohlen